Abdou N'Daffa Faye (died March 1967) was the assassin of Demba Diop, a minister in the government of Senegal. Faye shot Diop on 3 February 1967 in a parking lot in Thiès. Faye was sentenced to death by a Senegalese court, and was the first of two people to be executed in post-independence Senegal. He was executed by firing squad in March 1967.

However, according to Amnesty International, Faye was the second and most recent person to have been executed by Senegal. This information is contradicted by other sources, which report that Moustapha Lô was executed in June 1967 and that Faye was, in fact, the first person executed by Senegal.

References
Amnesty International (1989). When the State Kills: The Death Penalty v. Human Rights (New York: Amnesty International) p. 200
——, "West Africa: Time to Abolish the Death Penalty", 2003-10-10
Keesing's Publications (1972). Africa Independent: A Survey of Political Developments (New York: Scribner) p. 236

1967 deaths
20th-century executions by Senegal
Executed Senegalese people
Executed assassins
People executed by Senegal by firing squad
Senegalese assassins
People convicted of murder by Senegal
Senegalese people convicted of murder
Year of birth missing
1967 murders in Africa